A biosurvey, or biological survey, is a scientific study of organisms to assess the condition of an ecological resource, such as a water body.

Overview
Biosurveys are used by government agencies responsible for management of public lands, environmental planning and/or environmental regulation to assess ecological resources, such as rivers, streams, lakes and wetlands. They involve collection and analysis of animal and/or plant samples which serve as bioindicators. The studies may be conducted by professional scientists or volunteer organizations.  They are conducted according to published procedures to ensure consistency in data collection and analysis, and to compare findings to established metrics.

Biosurveys typically use metrics such as species composition and richness (e.g. number of species, extent of pollution-tolerant species), and ecological factors (number of individuals, proportion of predators, presence of disease). Biosurveys may identify pollution problems that are difficult or expensive to detect using chemical testing procedures.

A biosurvey may be used to generate an index of biological integrity (IBI), a scoring system for an ecological resource.

Water resource biosurveys
Protocols for conducting biosurveys of water resources have been published by state government agencies and the U.S. Environmental Protection Agency (EPA). Agencies use these protocols to implement the Clean Water Act. Similar protocols have been published by volunteer organizations.

See also
Bioassay
Biological integrity
Biomonitoring
Indicator species
Water pollution
Water quality

References

External links

Biological Assessment of Water Quality – US EPA
Guide to Aquatic Invertebrates - WV Save Our Streams Program
Online biomonitoring of water quality by a permanent record of bivalve molluscs' behavior and physiology (biological rhythms, growth rate, spawning, early warning), 24/7, worldwide: the MolluSCAN eye  project
 

Aquatic ecology
Bioindicators
Environmental science
Measurement of biodiversity
Water pollution